Atis Kronvalds or Kronvaldu Atis (15 April 1837 – 17 February 1875) was a Latvian writer, linguist and pedagogue, as well as a prominent member of the Young Latvia movement.

Early life
Kronvalds was born to a tailor family, but was raised by priests of Durbe. After studies in Liepāja he became a private teacher. In 1860 he started to study medicine at the University of Berlin; however, he left after half a year when he ran out of money. He returned to Latvia, where he resumed work as a private teacher in Durbe.

Participation in "Young Latvians" movement
After returning to Latvia, Kronvalds joined the Latvian nationalist movement "Young Latvians" and became a passionate advocate of Latvian rights, language, and culture. In 1865 he moved to Tartu to study pedagogy at the University of Tartu. In 1868 he became a teacher at the teacher seminary there. He participated in the social activities of local Latvian society; notably, he renewed the "Latvian evenings" tradition begun by Krišjānis Valdemārs. He also wrote works of educational theory and several articles on education and linguistics. In 1872 he wrote Nationale Bestrebungen, the manifesto of the Young Latvians. In 1873 Kronvalds moved to Vecpiebalga, where he worked as a teacher in a local school; he also participated by delivering two speeches, in the first Latvian Song and Dance Festival in the same year. He is one of the most famous Latvian authors of all time.

Works 
 Dzeja jeb poēzija (1869)
 Vecas valodas jauni vārdi (1869)
 Tēvuzemes mīlestība (1871)
 Valodas kopējiem (1872)
 Nationale Bestrebungen (1872)
 Tautiskie centieni (1887)
 Kopoti raksti 2 sēj. (1936—1937)
 Selected works Tagadnei (1987)

References

1837 births
1875 deaths
People from Priekule Municipality
People from Courland Governorate
Linguists from Latvia
Latvian writers
19th-century Latvian people
19th-century writers from the Russian Empire
Educators from the Russian Empire
University of Tartu alumni